The short-tail lanternshark (Etmopterus brachyurus) is a shark of the family Etmopteridae found in the western Pacific between latitudes 37°N and 30°S, at depths of between .

Reproduction is ovoviviparous.

References

Compagno, Dando, & Fowler, Sharks of the World, Princeton University Press, New Jersey 2005 

Etmopterus
Taxa named by Hugh McCormick Smith
Taxa named by Lewis Radcliffe
Fish described in 1912